Haven Hubbard Home, also known as Hamilton Grove, is a historic sanitarium and national historic district located in Olive Township, St. Joseph County, Indiana.  The district encompasses six contributing buildings and one contributing site on a former sanitarium originally developed as a working farm.  It was developed between about 1860 and 1961, and includes examples of Second Empire, Queen Anne, Colonial Revival, and Collegiate Gothic architecture.  Notable buildings include the Hubbard Homestead Home (c. 1860 /c. 1895), Homestead Shed (c. 1880), Homestead Barn (c. 1880), Pump House (c. 1860), Epp Hall (1922, 1964, 1984), and Haven Hubbard Home Parsonage (1960).

It was listed on the National Register of Historic Places in 2013.

The Hubbard family 
Both Jonathon and Ransom had come from Oneida County, New York, where Ransom had been born in 1817.
Jonathon platted the town of "Hubbard Town" on the prairie, originally going to be named Terre Coupee town, which was later re-named the village of Hamilton.

Ransom's son Haven, by his wife Mary (née Mary Davis), was born on 1853-12-04; with Jonathon then dying in 1861.
Haven was educated at Notre Dame University and the University of Michigan and married Arminia Hoffman in 1909, who inherited the estate from him in 1916.
Arminia had come to the United States from Leipzig in 1891, where she had been born on 1865-05-09.
In 1920, finally furthering her late husband's wish during his lifetime to minister to the elderly, Arminia Hubbard deeded the farm to a local church, which built the Haven Hubbard Memorial Old People's Home in 1922 and formally dedicated it on 1923-05-05.

The Old People's Home remained a working farm, with residents encouraged to help with tending to crops, and comprised a chapel on the second floor, to be later remodelled in 1950 and named the Arminia Hubbard Memorial Chapel, administrative offices, sun parlours, a dining hall, guest rooms, and open-air verandahs.

Haven's elder brother was Lucius, born in 1844 and educated in the same places as Haven, who married a Martha Davis and in turn had a son Arthur Lucius Hubbard, who was to become a prominent banker and attorney in nearby South Bend, Indiana, forming a law partnership with Samuel Pettengill.

References

Bibliography

Further reading 

 

Historic districts on the National Register of Historic Places in Indiana
Queen Anne architecture in Indiana
Neoclassical architecture in Indiana
Colonial Revival architecture in Indiana
Collegiate Gothic architecture in Indiana
Historic districts in St. Joseph County, Indiana
National Register of Historic Places in St. Joseph County, Indiana